Two Minas Geraes-class battleships were built for the Brazilian Navy in the early twentieth century.

In 1904, Brazil began a major naval building program that included three small battleships. Designing and ordering the ships took two years, but these plans were scrapped after the revolutionary dreadnought concept rendered the Brazilian design obsolete. Two dreadnoughts were instead ordered from the United Kingdom, making Brazil the third country to have ships of this type under construction, before traditional powers like Germany, France, or Russia. As such, the ships created much uncertainty among the major countries in the world, many of whom incorrectly speculated the ships were actually destined for a rival nation. Similarly, they also caused much consternation in Argentina and, consequently, Chile.

Soon after their delivery in 1910, both Minas Geraes and São Paulo were embroiled in the Revolt of the Lash (Revolta da Chibata), in which the crews of four Brazilian ships demanded the abolition of corporal punishment in the navy. The mutineers surrendered after four days, when a bill was passed granting amnesty to all those involved. In 1922, the two battleships were used to help put down a revolt at Fort Copacabana. Two years later, lieutenants on São Paulo mutinied but found little support from other military units, so they sailed to Montevideo, Uruguay, and obtained asylum. Minas Geraes was modernized in the 1930s, but both battleships were too old to participate actively in the Second World War, and instead were employed as harbor defense ships in Salvador and Recife. São Paulo was sold in 1951 to a British shipbreaker, but was lost in a storm north of the Azores while being towed to its final destination. Minas Geraes was sold to an Italian scrapper in 1953 and towed to Genoa the following year.

Background 

Brazil's navy fell into obsolescence after an 1889 revolution, which deposed Emperor Dom Pedro II, and an 1893 civil war. Meanwhile, an Argentine–Chilean dispute over the boundary of Patagonia and control of the Beagle Channel kindled a naval arms race between the two beginning in the late 1880s and lasting until 1902. Restrictions were placed on the navies of both countries and major vessels under construction in both navies were sold as part of the British-mediated three pacts which ended the dispute, but both countries retained the numerous vessels built in the interim. As such, by the turn of the 20th century the Brazilian Navy lagged far behind the Chilean and Argentine navies in quality and total tonnage, despite Brazil having nearly three times the population of Argentina and almost five times the population of Chile.

Soaring demand for coffee and rubber brought Brazil an influx of revenue in the early 1900s. Simultaneously, there was a drive on the part of prominent Brazilians, most notably the Baron of Rio Branco, to have the country recognized as an international power. A large naval acquisition program was drawn up and passed by the National Congress of Brazil in October 1904 in accordance with their belief that a powerful navy would be crucial to the achievement of this goal, but it was two years before any ships were ordered.

Two factions argued over the types of ships to be ordered. One favored a navy centered on a small number of large warships, while the other preferred a larger navy of smaller warships. The latter originally prevailed with a bill authorizing the construction of three small battleships, three armored cruisers, six destroyers, twelve torpedo boats, three submarines, and two river monitors. Though the Brazilian government later eliminated the armored cruisers for monetary reasons, the Minister of the Navy, Admiral Júlio César de Noronha, signed a contract with Armstrong Whitworth for three battleships on 23 July 1906. While the first designs for these ships were derived from the Norwegian coastal defense ship  and the British (originally Chilean) , the contracted ships were to follow Armstrong Whitworth's Design 439 (Design 188 in Vickers' files). They would displace 11,800 long tons (12,000 tonnes), have a speed of 19 knots (22 mph; 35 km/h), and be protected by belt armor of 9 inches (23 cm) and deck armor of 1.5 in (3.8 cm). Each ship would be armed with twelve 10-inch (25 cm) guns mounted in six twin turrets. These turrets would be mounted in a hexagonal configuration, similar to the later German s.

Alarmed, the American ambassador to Brazil sent a cablegram to his Department of State in September 1906, warning them of the destabilization that would occur if the situation devolved into a full naval arms race. At the same time, the American government under Theodore Roosevelt tried using diplomatic means to coerce the Brazilians into canceling their ships, but the attempts were dismissed, with the Baron of Rio Branco remarking that caving to the American demands would render Brazil as powerless as suzerain Cuba. The President of Brazil, Afonso Pena, supported the naval acquisitions in an address to the National Congress of Brazil in November 1906, as in his opinion the ships were necessary to replace the antiquated and obsolete vessels of the current navy.

Bidding and construction 

Two of these ships were laid down by Armstrong at Elswick in Newcastle upon Tyne (Minas Geraes and Rio de Janeiro), while the other was subcontracted out to Vickers in Barrow (São Paulo). However, the new dreadnought concept, which was showcased upon the completion of the namesake ship in December 1906, rendered the Brazilian ships obsolete. A transition to a few large warships was finalized with the selection of Rear Admiral Alexandrino Faria de Alencar for the powerful post of minister of the navy. The money authorized for naval expansion was redirected by de Alencar to building two dreadnoughts, with plans for a third dreadnought after the first was completed, two scout cruisers (which became the Bahia class), ten destroyers (the Pará class), and three submarines. The three battleships on which construction had just begun were demolished beginning on 7 January 1907.

An entirely new design incorporating the latest dreadnought technology was drawn up by J.R. Perrett, the head of Elswick Ordnance Company, and approved by the Brazilian government on 20 February 1907. Argentina and Chile immediately annulled the 1902 treaty that had ended their naval arms race, and both planned to expand their own navies, though Chile was delayed by a financial depression in 1907 and a major earthquake the next year.

, the lead ship, was laid down by Armstrong on 17 April 1907, while its sister ship  followed thirteen days later at Vickers. Construction of the partial hull needed to launch Minas Geraes was delayed by a four-month strike to 10 September 1908, and São Paulo followed on 19 April 1909. Both were christened in front of large crowds by the wife of Francisco Régis de Oliveira, the Brazilian ambassador to the United Kingdom. After multiple trials of the speed, endurance, efficiency, and weaponry of the ship, Minas Geraes was completed and handed over to Brazil on 5 January 1910. São Paulo followed in July, after its own trials. The third dreadnought, which would have been named  and was provided for in the original contract, was laid down on 16 March, but as the ship had already been eclipsed by new naval technology (chiefly the advent of super-dreadnoughts, beginning with the British ), the Brazilian government canceled it on 7 May and asked Armstrong to prepare a new design.

At this time, the dreadnought design had not been fully validated, despite the success of the British namesake; for example, there were still concerns that the Minas Geraes class' superfiring turret arrangement—which had not been utilized on the original Dreadnought, but was also being installed on the American —would cause blast to hurt the crew in the lower turret. Any immediate concerns, however, were mitigated during the firing tests when no ill effects were observed, though the Times (London) reported that there were still concerns registered during São Paulos gun trials in June 1910.

International reaction 

The start of work on Minas Geraes meant that Brazil had become the third country—behind the United Kingdom and the United States but ahead of major powers such as Germany, France, Russia and Japan—to have a dreadnought under construction.

The order for the dreadnoughts caused an immediate stir in the United States and Europe; in the words of the British Navy League Annual, they "astonished the naval world". The American New York Times opened an article on Minas Geraes launch with "What on paper at least is the most powerful warship ever built for any navy ...", while Scientific American called Minas Geraes "the last word in heavy battleship design and the ... most powerfully armed warship afloat." Some publications, like the American Advocate of Peace, decried the dreadnought purchase for its cost, calling it "a showy and pretentious naval policy seemingly for the sheer indulgence of national pride" and continuing with "[sinking] money into useless warships when, it is understood, foreign money has had to be borrowed for city improvements in Rio de Janeiro is pitiful politics."

The British House of Commons debated purchasing the ships in March 1908 to bolster the Royal Navy while simultaneously ensuring they would not be sold to a foreign rival. The topic arose again in July and September, when Arthur Lee expressed his discomfort at the possible final dispositions of the Brazilian ships, as any sale had the potential to disrupt their "Two-Power Standard". International Marine Engineering analyzed the effect of a sale to Japan, stating that the total broadside weight of Japan's line of battle would be increased by 31.6%, and the only ships capable of matching the Minas Geraes in the near future would be the American  and German es.

Newspapers and journals around the world speculated that Brazil was acting as a proxy for a naval power which would take possession of the two dreadnoughts soon after completion, as they did not believe that a previously insignificant geopolitical power would contract for such powerful armament. The evidence for a sale seemed strong, as Brazilian attempts to float a multi-million-dollar loan against the value of their coffee crop in 1908 were unsuccessful. With three dreadnoughts planned (including the upcoming ), a Spanish naval journal stated "it was only natural that rumors [would begin] to circulate supporting the argument that Brazil acted as an intermediary for some great power which would acquire them before they terminate their construction." Various British papers speculated that either the Germans, Japanese, or Americans were actually buying the ships, while naval experts in Germany thought the Americans, British, or Japanese were going to take them over. On the other side of the Atlantic, some American papers theorized that the ships would be sold to the United Kingdom, Germany, or Japan. The Brazilian government was forced to deny these spurious allegations several times. The New York Times remarked:

Despite the speculation, the United States quickly began courting Brazil as an ally; caught up in the spirit, US naval journals began using terms like "Pan Americanism" and "Hemispheric Cooperation".

In South America, the ships came as a rude shock and kindled a naval arms race among Brazil, Argentina, and Chile. The 1902 treaty between the latter two was canceled upon the Brazilian dreadnought order so both could be free to build their own dreadnoughts. Argentina in particular was alarmed at the possible power of the ships. The Minister of Foreign Affairs, Manuel Augusto Montes de Oca, remarked that either Minas Geraes or São Paulo could destroy the entire Argentine and Chilean fleets. While this may have been hyperbole, either one was much more powerful than any single vessel in the Argentinian fleet.

Ships

Service histories 
After completion, both Minas Geraes and São Paulo sailed to other countries before arriving in Brazil. Minas Geraes left the Tyne on 5 February 1910 and traveled to Plymouth before beginning a voyage to the United States on 8 February. The ship was assigned to escort the American armored cruiser , carrying the body of the former Brazilian ambassador to the United States Joaquim Nabuco, to Rio de Janeiro. They arrived in the city on 17 April 1910. São Paulo left Greenock on 16 September 1910, and stopped in Cherbourg, France, to embark the Brazilian President Hermes da Fonseca. Departing on the 27th, São Paulo voyaged to Lisbon, Portugal, where Fonseca was a guest of Portugal's King Manuel II. Soon after they arrived, the 5 October 1910 revolution began. Although the President offered political asylum to the King and his family, the offer was refused. There was a rumor that the King was on board and revolutionaries attempted to search the ship, but were denied permission. They also asked for Brazil to land marines "to help in the maintenance of order," but this request was also denied. São Paulo left Lisbon on 7 October for Rio de Janeiro, and docked there on 25 October.

Revolt of the Lash 

Soon after São Paulos arrival, a major rebellion known as the Revolt of the Lash, or Revolta da Chibata, broke out on four of the newest ships in the Brazilian Navy. The initial spark was provided on 16 November 1910 when Afro-Brazilian sailor Marcelino Rodrigues Menezes was brutally flogged 250 times for insubordination. Many Afro-Brazilian sailors were sons of former slaves, or were former slaves freed under the Lei Áurea (abolition) but forced to enter the navy. They had been planning a revolt for some time, and Menezes became the catalyst. Further preparations were needed, so the rebellion was delayed until 22 November. The crewmen of Minas Geraes, São Paulo, the twelve-year-old , and the new  quickly took their vessels with only a minimum of bloodshed: two officers on Minas Geraes and one each on São Paulo and Bahia were killed.

The ships were well-supplied with foodstuffs, ammunition, and coal, and the only demand of mutineers—led by João Cândido Felisberto—was the abolition of "slavery as practiced by the Brazilian Navy". They objected to low pay, long hours, inadequate training for incompetent sailors, and punishments including bôlo (being struck on the hand with a ferrule) and the use of whips or lashes (chibata), which eventually became a symbol of the revolt. By the 23rd, the National Congress had begun discussing the possibility of a general amnesty for the sailors. Senator Ruy Barbosa, long an opponent of slavery, lent a large amount of support, and the measure unanimously passed the Federal Senate on 24 November. The measure was then sent to the Chamber of Deputies.

Humiliated by the revolt, naval officers and the president of Brazil were staunchly opposed to amnesty, so they quickly began planning to assault the rebel ships. The former believed such an action was necessary to restore the service's honor. Late on the 24th, the President ordered the naval officers to attack the mutineers. Officers crewed some smaller warships and the cruiser , Bahias sister ship with ten 4.7-inch guns. They planned to attack on the morning of the 25th, when the government expected the mutineers would return to Guanabara Bay. When they did not return and the amnesty measure neared passage in the Chamber of Deputies, the order was rescinded. After the bill passed 125–23 and the president signed it into law, the mutineers stood down on the 26th.

During the revolt, the ships were noted by many observers to be well-handled, despite a previous belief that the Brazilian Navy was incapable of effectively operating the ships even before being split by a rebellion. João Cândido Felisberto ordered all liquor thrown overboard, and discipline on the ships was recognized as exemplary. The 4.7-inch guns were often used for shots over the city, but the 12-inch were not, which led to a suspicion among the naval officers that the rebels were incapable of using the weapons. Later research and interviews indicate that Minas Geraes guns were fully operational, and while São Paulos could not be turned after salt water contaminated the hydraulic system, British engineers still on board the ship after the voyage from the United Kingdom were working on the problem. Still, historians have never ascertained how well the mutineers could handle the ships.

Later career 
Three years after the mutiny, Minas Geraes was used to transport Brazilian Minister of Foreign Affairs Lauro Müller to the United States. The ship returned on 16 July and arrived in Rio de Janeiro on 16 August. In September both Minas Geraes and São Paulo participated in a major exercise with most of the Brazilian Navy. The need for more modern fire control system was identified as early as late 1913, but no action was taken. When Brazil entered the First World War in 1917, they were offered to the United Kingdom for service in the Grand Fleet, but the British declined due to the condition the ships were in. They had not been modernized since entering service, and maintenance had been neglected; to illustrate the problem, when Brazil sent São Paulo to the United States for a modernization in June 1918, fourteen of the eighteen boilers that powered the ship failed. The ship only finished the voyage to New York with the assistance of the American battleship  and cruiser . Minas Geraes followed after its sister's return, and the modernization was done between 1 September 1920 and 1 October 1921.

São Paulo made two trips to Europe in 1920. The first conveyed King Albert I and Queen Elisabeth of Belgium to Brazil for the centennial celebrations. After São Paulo brought them home, the ship traveled to Portugal to take the bodies of the formerly-exiled Emperor Pedro II and his wife, Teresa Cristina, back to Brazil. In July 1922, both battleships helped to quash the first of the Tenente revolts (Revolução Tenentista), in which the garrison of Rio de Janeiro's Fort Copacabana rebelled and began bombarding the city. São Paulo shelled the fort, and the rebels surrendered shortly thereafter; Minas Geraes did not fire its guns. In 1924, three lieutenants, including Hercolino Cascardo, took over São Paulo with other crewmen. They were unsuccessful in swaying any other ships to their cause, except for an old torpedo boat, and soon sailed out of the harbor after firing a six-pounder gun at Minas Geraes. Short of food and with condensers in poor condition, the rebels sailed to Montevideo, where they received asylum. Minas Geraes followed São Paulo, arriving on 11 November and taking back possession of the ship.

Minas Geraes was modernized at the Rio de Janeiro Naval Yard from June 1931 to 1938, while São Paulo led a naval force that blockaded Santos during the Constitutionalist Revolution of 1932. Though Brazil had also intended to modernize São Paulo, its poor condition—she was only able to make  instead of its designed speed of —made such action uneconomical. Soon after Brazil's entrance into the Second World War on 21 August 1942, São Paulo was moved to Recife on 23 August to defend that port as a harbor defense ship; Minas Geraes played a similar role at Salvador. Even with the modernization, Minas Geraes was simply too old and vulnerable to actively participate in the war.

Both ships were decommissioned after the war, São Paulo on 2 August 1947 and Minas Geraes on 31 December 1952. The former was sold to a British shipbreaker and was towed out of Rio de Janeiro on 20 September 1951. When north of the Azores in a strong storm, the tow line snapped. Though multiple searches were mounted by American and British aircraft, the ship was never found. Minas Geraes was sold to an Italian company in 1953 and towed to Genoa from 11 March 1954 to 22 April.

Specifications 

At the beginning of their careers, the ships were crewed by about 900 men.

Minas Geraes and São Paulo were originally armed with twelve 12-inch/45 caliber, twenty-two 4.7-inch/50 caliber, eighteen 3-pounders and eight 1-pounder naval guns. The main battery was arranged with four superfiring turrets, two each fore and aft, and two placed en echelon. The 4.7-inch secondary guns were placed in casemates along the side of the ship.

The propulsion of the two ships was provided by Vickers vertical triple expansion engines instead of the steam turbines being used to power most contemporary dreadnoughts. Eighteen boilers provided power to the engines, which in turn rotated the two three-bladed propellers with 23,500 shaft horsepower.

The main armor belt was Krupp cemented and nine inches (230 mm) thick, but narrowed to six and three inches (150 and 76 mm) closer to each end of the ships. The barbettes were protected by nine-inch armor, while the turret had a twelve-inch (300 mm) front, eight-inch (200 mm) sides, and a two- to three-inch (51 to 76 mm) top, and the conning tower had twelve-inch armor. The deck armor had multiple decks of one-and-a-half to two inches (38 to 51 mm), one inch (25 mm), and one inch.

Footnotes

Endnotes

References 
 "Brazil." Journal of the American Society of Naval Engineers 20, no. 3 (1909): 833–836. . .
 "British-Brazilian Warships." The Navy (Washington) 2, no. 1 (1908): 11–12. .
 Campbell, John. Naval Weapons of World War II. Annapolis: Naval Institute Press, 1985. . .
 Campbell, N.J.M. "Germany." In Gardiner and Gray, Conway's, 134–189.
 "E Minas Geraes." Navios De Guerra Brasileiros. Last modified 7 June 2009.
 "E São Paulo." Navios De Guerra Brasileiros. Last modified 28 April 2009.
 Earle, Ralph. "Professional Notes." Proceedings 38, no. 1 (1912): 303–80. .
 English, Adrian J. Armed Forces of Latin America. London: Jane's Publishing Inc., 1984. . .
 Gardiner, Robert and Randal Gray, eds. Conway's All the World's Fighting Ships 1906–1921. Annapolis: Naval Institute Press, 1985. . .
 Livermore, Seward W. "Battleship Diplomacy in South America: 1905–1925." The Journal of Modern History 16, no. 1 (1944): 31–44. . . .
 Martins, João Roberto, Filho. "Colossos do mares [Colossuses of the Seas]." Revista de História da Biblioteca Nacional 3, no. 27 (2007): 74–77. . .
 Mead, Edwin D. "Reaction in South America." Advocate of Peace 70, no. 10 (1908): 238–241. . .
 "Minas Geraes I." Serviço de Documentação da Marinha – Histórico de Navios. Diretoria do Patrimônio Histórico e Documentação da Marinha, Departamento de História Marítima. Accessed 27 January 2015.
 Morgan, Zachary R. "The Revolt of the Lash, 1910." In Naval Mutinies of the Twentieth Century: An International Perspective, edited by Christopher M. Bell and Bruce A. Elleman, 32–53. Portland, Oregon: Frank Cass Publishers, 2003. . .
 Office of Naval Intelligence (ONI). Information Concerning Some of the Principal Navies of the World; A Series of Tables Compiled to Answer Popular Inquiry. Washington, D.C.: U.S. Government Printing Office, 1912. .
 Poggio, Guilherme. "Um encouraçado contra o forte: 2ª Parte [A Battleship against the Fort: Part 2]." n.d. Poder Naval Online. Last modified 12 April 2009.
 Preston, Antony. "Great Britain." In Gardiner and Gray, Conway's, 1–104.
 Ribeiro, Paulo de Oliveira. "Os Dreadnoughts da Marinha do Brasil: Minas Geraes e São Paulo [The Dreadnoughts of the Brazilian Navy: Minas Geraes and São Paulo]." Poder Naval Online. Last modified 15 June 2009.
 "São Paulo I." Serviço de Documentação da Marinha – Histórico de Navios. Diretoria do Patrimônio Histórico e Documentação da Marinha, Departamento de História Marítima. Accessed 27 January 2015.
 Scheina, Robert L. "Argentina." In Gardiner and Gray, Conway's, 400–403.
 ———. "Brazil." In Gardiner and Gray, Conway's, 403–407.
 ———. Latin America: A Naval History 1810–1987. Annapolis: Naval Institute Press, 1987. . .
 ———. Latin America's Wars. Washington, D.C.: Brassey's, 2003. . .
 "The Brazilian Battleship "Minas Geraes"." Journal of the United States Artillery 33, no. 2 (1910): 179–188. . .
 "The Brazilian Battleship "Minas Geraes"." Scientific American 102, no. 12 (1910): 240–241. . .
 "The Brazilian Dreadnoughts." International Marine Engineering 13, no. 8 (1908): 362–363. . .
 "The Brazilian "Dreadnoughts"." The Navy (Washington) 2, no. 6 (1908): 13–14. .
 "The Reported Purchase of Dreadnoughts." The Navy (Washington) 2, no. 7 (1908): 39. .
 Topliss, David. "The Brazilian Dreadnoughts, 1904–1914." Warship International 25, no. 3 (1988), 240–289. . .
 Vanterpool, Alan. "The Riachuleo." Warship International 6, no. 2 (1969): 140–141.
 Whitley, M.J. Battleships of World War Two: An International Encyclopedia. Annapolis: Naval Institute Press, 1998. . .

External links 

 British diplomatic documents relating to the dreadnought race (FO 508/8; Adam Matthew subscription required)
 
 
 Minas Geraes on Flickr (LOC)

Battleship classes
 
Battleships of the United Kingdom